Brominated vegetable oil (BVO) is a complex mixture of plant-derived triglycerides that have been reacted to contain atoms of the element bromine bonded to the molecules. Brominated vegetable oil is used primarily to help emulsify citrus-flavored soft drinks, preventing them from separating during distribution. Brominated vegetable oil has been used by the soft drink industry since 1931, generally at a level of about 8 ppm.

Careful control of the type of oil used allows bromination of it to produce BVO with a specific density of 1.33 g/mL, which is noticeably greater than that of water (1 g/mL). As a result, it can be mixed with less-dense flavoring agents such as citrus flavor oil to produce a resulting oil, the density of which matches that of water or other products. The droplets containing BVO remain suspended in the water rather than separating and floating at the surface.

Alternative food additives used for the same purpose include sucrose acetate isobutyrate (SAIB, E444) and glycerol ester of wood rosin (ester gum, E445).

Regulation and use

United States 
In the United States, BVO was designated in 1958 as generally recognized as safe (GRAS), but this was withdrawn by the U.S. Food and Drug Administration in 1970.  The U.S. Code of Federal Regulations currently imposes restrictions on the use of BVO as a food additive in the United States, limiting the concentration to 15 ppm, limiting the amount of free fatty acids to 2.5 percent, and limiting the iodine value to 16. 

An online petition at Change.org asking PepsiCo to stop adding BVO to Gatorade and other products collected over 200,000 signatures by January 2013. The petition pointed out that since Gatorade is sold in countries where BVO is not approved, there is already an existing formulation without this ingredient. PepsiCo announced in January 2013 that it would no longer use BVO in Gatorade. 

On May 5, 2014, Coca-Cola and PepsiCo said they would remove BVO from their products. As of 2020, Mountain Dew, manufactured by PepsiCo, no longer uses BVO in the main line of beverages, but the original BVO-containing formula is still sometimes sold as the lesser distributed "Mountain Dew Throwback" beverage. 

BVO is used in Sun Drop, made by the Dr Pepper Snapple Group. Numerous generic citrus sodas also use it, including; "Mountain Lightning"/Walmart sodas, "Clover Valley"/Dollar General sodas, "Orangette" and Stars & Stripes. BVO is much less frequently used as an emulsifier in non-carbonated drinks, such as flavoring syrups for caffeinated beverages and specialty juices. 

BVO is one of four substances that the U.S. Food and Drug Administration has defined as interim food additives; the other three are acrylonitrile copolymers, mannitol, and saccharin.

Canada 
BVO is currently permitted as a food additive in Canada, but only in beverages containing citrus or spruce oils.

Europe 
In the European Union, BVO is banned from use as a food additive; and any BVO-containing products that may slip through the regulations are pulled from shelves upon discovery. In the EU, beverage companies commonly use glycerol ester of wood rosin or locust bean gum as an alternative to BVO.

India 
Standards for soft drinks in India have prohibited the use of BVO since 1990.

Japan 
The use of BVO as a food additive has been banned in Japan since 2010.

Health effects 
There are case reports of adverse effects associated with excessive consumption of BVO-containing products. One case reported that a man who consumed two to four liters of a soda containing BVO on a daily basis experienced memory loss, tremors, fatigue, loss of muscle coordination, headache, and ptosis of the right eyelid, as well as elevated serum chloride. In the two months it took to correctly diagnose the problem, the patient also lost the ability to walk. Eventually, bromism was diagnosed and hemodialysis was prescribed which resulted in a reversal of the disorder.

References

External links 
 Brominated Battle: Soda Chemical Has Cloudy Health History
 WHO/Food and Agriculture Organization 1970 report
 Behavioral and reproductive effects of chronic developmental exposure to brominated vegetable oil in rats
 FDA Everything Added to Food in the United States (EAFUS) entry for brominated vegetable oil
 Gesundheitliche Bewertung von Erfrischungsgetränken mit zugesetzten bromierten Pflanzenölen. Stellungnahme Nr. 023/2014 des Bundesinstituts für Risikobewertung vom 4. Juli 2014 

Food emulsifiers
Vegetable oils
Bromine